Plutodes cyclaria is a species of moth of the family Geometridae first described by Achille Guenée in 1857. It is found in the north-eastern Borneo, Sumatra, Peninsular Malaysia.

References

Plutodini
Moths of Borneo